Padéma (official name), sometimes also named Badéma or Badéna, is a department or commune of Houet Province in Hauts-Bassins Region, Burkina Faso.

References 

Departments of Burkina Faso
Houet Province